Inanidrilus is a genus of marine annelid worms, first described by Christer Erséus in 1979. They are gutless and live in the interstitial of tropical and subtropical seas.

Species
Species in this genus include:

References

 
Annelid genera
Taxa named by Christer Erséus